Seraphim was Greek Orthodox Patriarch of Antioch (1813–1823).

Literature

External links
 Primates of the Apostolic See of Antioch

Greek Orthodox Patriarchs of Antioch